Insurance Company of North America Building can refer to:
 Insurance Company of North America Building (New York, New York)
 Insurance Company of North America Building (Philadelphia, Pennsylvania)